The Eppley Hotel Company was located in Omaha, Nebraska. At the time of its acquisition by the Sheraton Corporation in 1956, it had 22 properties, and it was the largest privately held hotel business in the United States.

About
Owned by hotel magnate Eugene C. Eppley, the company was established in 1917. By 1956 there were 22 hotels spread across six states.

Properties
Of the 22 hotels in the Eppley Hotel Company's portfolio that were sold to Sheraton in 1956, some of the most notable hotels  included Pittsburgh's William Penn Hotel, the Seelbach Hotel in Louisville, Kentucky the Hotel Fontenelle in Omaha, Nebraska and Sioux City's Warrior Hotel that was built in 1929 but had its Grand Opening December 20th 1930. 

Eppley Hotels sold the Warrior and most of its hotel assets to the Sheraton Corporation of America in 1956.

Omaha's Hotel Fontenelle was built in 1914. An exquisite venue, the Fontenelle hosted dignitaries and luminaries of all sorts, including Presidents Harry S. Truman and John F. Kennedy. After Eppley sold it to the Sheraton corporation, the hotel eventually went to ruins, closing in the 1970s. It was demolished in 1983.

The West Hotel in Sioux City, Iowa, which was built in 1903 and became part of the Eppley chain of hotels in the mid-1930s was razed in 1953. 

In 1927, Eppley commissioned four murals by Grant Wood for his hotels in Council Bluffs, Cedar Rapids, Waterloo and Sioux City. The original piece painted for Eppley's Martin Hotel dining room in Sioux City, one of the Corn Room series, is now located in the Sioux City Art Center.

Merger
Eugene Eppley sold the company to Sheraton Hotels in 1956 for $30 million. The hotel chain's sale was, at the time, the second largest hotel sale in United States history.

See also
 History of Omaha
 Economy of Omaha, Nebraska

References

External links
 Restaurant Ware Pattern & Other Ephemera from the hotel chain

Defunct companies based in Omaha, Nebraska
Hotel chains in the United States
Hospitality companies established in 1917
1917 establishments in Nebraska